Ultraspank is the debut studio album by the American nu metal band Ultraspank. It was released on March 31, 1998 on Epic Records.

Their song "5" was featured on the PlayStation video game 3Xtreme.

Track listing
 "No Man, My Hands are Dirty" - 0:17
 "5" - 4:56
 "Butter" - 3:38
 "Slip" - 4:26
 "Suck" - 3:19
 "Wrapped" - 4:07
 "Perfect" - 4:41
 "Sponge" - 4:53
 "Fired" - 3:14
 "Worn" - 4:57
 "Burnt" - 3:57
 "Better Luck Next Time" - 2:44
 "Asphyxiate" - 4:33 (Japanese bonus track)
 "Suck" (Live) - 3:43 (Japanese bonus track)

 "Asphyxiate" and "Suck (Live)" are also featured on the "Turn Your Head & Cough" EP.
 "Suck (Live)" was recorded on March 31, 1998 at the Cabaret Metro.

Personnel
Pete Murray - vocals, programming
Neil Godfrey - guitar
Jerry Oliviera - guitar
Dan Ogden - bass, backing vocals
Tyler Clark - drums, backing vocals
Stephen Marcussen - mastering
David Bottrill - production, mixing

References

1998 debut albums
Ultraspank albums